American Top 40 (previously abbreviated to AT40) is an internationally syndicated, independent song countdown radio program created by Casey Kasem, Don Bustany, Tom Rounds, and Ron Jacobs. The program is currently hosted by Ryan Seacrest and presented as an adjunct to his weekday radio program, On Air with Ryan Seacrest.

Originally a production of Watermark Inc. (later a division of ABC Radio known as ABC Watermark, now Cumulus Media Networks), American Top 40 is now distributed by Premiere Networks (a division of iHeartMedia). Nearly 500 radio stations in the United States, and several other territories worldwide air American Top 40, making it one of the most listened-to weekly radio programs in the world. It can also be heard on iHeartRadio, TuneIn, and the official American Top 40 applications on mobile smartphones and tablets as well as on Xbox 360, Xbox One, PlayStation 4 consoles (via iHeartRadio's console app), and the Armed Forces Network. GEICO is the main sponsor for the show.

Co-creator Casey Kasem hosted the original American Top 40 from its inauguration on July 4, 1970, until August 6, 1988. Shadoe Stevens took over the program on August 13, 1988, and hosted until January 28, 1995, when the original program came to an end. Three years later, Kasem teamed up with Premiere's predecessor AMFM Radio Networks to relaunch American Top 40. Kasem, who had spent nine years hosting his own countdown Casey's Top 40 for Westwood One, returned to hosting his creation on March 28, 1998. Seacrest took over American Top 40 on January 10, 2004, following Kasem's retirement from the series.

Currently, American Top 40 with Seacrest airs in two formats, with one distributed to Contemporary Hit Radio (Top 40) stations and the other to Hot Adult Contemporary stations. However, there is no distinction made between the two shows on air. There are also two classic editions of the original American Top 40 distributed every weekend, featuring past Kasem-hosted shows from the 1970s and 1980s.

In its early years, American Top 40 used the Billboard charts to compile the countdown, touting it as "the only source". The program subsequently switched to being based on Radio and Records airplay data upon its late 1990s return, until R&R was folded into Billboard in 2009. The current source for the American Top 40 charts are unpublished mainstream Top 40 and hot adult contemporary charts compiled by Mediabase.

In October 2021, the show stopped using the AT40 abbreviation and now uses its full name on air. Despite this, some affiliates still use the abbreviation when promoting the show.

History

1970–88: First Casey Kasem era

American Top 40 fittingly began on the Independence Day weekend in 1970, on seven radio stations, the first being KDEO in El Cajon, California (now KECR), which broadcast the inaugural show the evening of July 3, 1970. Billboard reported prior to the release of the show that it had been sold to stations in 10 radio markets.

The chart data broadcast actually included the top 40 songs from the week ending July 11, 1970. The first show featured the last time both Elvis Presley and The Beatles had songs simultaneously in the Top 10. It was originally distributed by Watermark Inc., and was first presented in mono until February 24, 1973, when the first stereo vinyl copies were distributed. In early 1982, Watermark was purchased by ABC Radio and AT40 became a program of the "ABC Contemporary Radio Network". The program was hosted by Casey Kasem and co-created by Kasem; Don Bustany, Kasem's childhood friend from Detroit, MI; radio veteran Tom Rounds; and 93/KHJ Program Director Ron Jacobs, who produced and directed the various production elements. Rounds was also the marketing director; the initial funder was California strawberry grower Tom Driscoll.

The show began as a three-hour program written and directed by Bustany, counting down the top 40 songs on Billboard's Hot 100 Singles chart. The show quickly gained popularity once it was commissioned, and expanded to a four-hour-program on October 7, 1978, to reflect the increasing average length of singles on Billboard's Hot 100 chart. The producing staff expanded to eight people, some of them still in the business: Nikki Wine, Ben Marichal, Scott Paton, Matt Wilson, Merrill Shindler, Guy Aoki, Ronnie Allen, and Sandy Stert Benjamin. (Bustany retired from AT40 in 1989; beginning in 1994, he hosted a political talk show on listener-sponsored KPFK.) By the early 1980s, the show could be heard on 520 stations in the United States and at its zenith, the show was broadcast on 1,000-plus stations in some 50 countries. In the 1980s, it aired in the United Kingdom on Signal Radio, DevonAir, Radio 210, County Sound, Chiltern Radio, Radio Tees, Saxon Radio and Fox FM and was also transmitted on Manx Radio. Kasem told the New York Times in 1990 "I accentuate the positive and eliminate the negative. That is the timeless thing."

Features of the Kasem-era shows
During Kasem's run as host, the AT40 show had a number of popular and distinguishing features, some of which Kasem had done for some time at stations like KRLA in Los Angeles:
 Bios & stories: Most segments of the show included two countdown songs. The second song in the segment would usually be introduced by Kasem with a brief story connected with the song, which could be about its performer, its composer, or a random bit of trivia. Kasem would often lead into the commercial break preceding the segment with a brief preview of the story, sometimes even giving away the song title or artist.

The top-ranking song on the chart always was introduced with one of these stories, which would be followed with a drum roll and the final reveal. Here is an example from the week of October 8, 1983:

 "Number" jingles: Occasionally, a song was preceded by a brief audio clip of a group of singers announcing the song's position on the chart (e.g. "Number 40!"). This was especially common for the first song played in each hour of the show and often for the first song after a commercial break, but was usually not done for the #1 song (which was usually introduced with a drum roll), or for songs preceded by a story. The "number" jingles were updated and re-recorded from time to time, and by the mid-1980s, the show began using two sets of "number" jingles: the standard set, to be used with up-tempo songs; and a softer alternative set, usually used with low-key or romantic songs.
 Chart trivia: AT40 also featured several letters in each show where a listener wrote to ask a chart trivia question. Sometimes these letters led to an extra song being played, though this became less common as songs increased in length in the 1980s.
 Long Distance Dedication: This feature evolved from a spoken-word 45 single that Kasem had recorded in 1964, "Letter from Elaina", in which a girl wrote to Kasem about her encounter with The Beatles.

In a 2007 Valentine's Day special edition of American Top 10 (and explained earlier in Rob Durkee's book American Top 40: The Countdown of the Century), Kasem explained that the LDD feature was intended to be part of the show from the beginning. He knew, however, that it was going to take some time before a listener wrote in with a request and let the process proceed organically. Kasem's patience proved correct, as staffer Matt Wilson found such a letter while checking the show's mail in August 1978. The listener asked Kasem to play the song "Desiree" by Neil Diamond, which he dedicated to his girlfriend of the same name who was moving to West Germany to live with her family on an Army base. The request was fulfilled on the weekend of August 26, 1978; when that show was rebroadcast the weekend of August 25–26, 2007, Kasem recorded two optional segments (played at the discretion of the station) in which he did phone interviews with the man and his former girlfriend about the LDD. Most shows featured two long distance dedications, usually with one during each half of the show. (Sometimes, a song currently in the countdown was requested as a LDD; in such cases, Kasem would typically read the dedication first, and sometimes not even announce the song's chart status until after the song was played.) This feature endured on AT40 into Shadoe Stevens' run as host of the show, from 1988 to 1995, and also followed Kasem on his Westwood One shows, first as "Request and Dedication", and then back to LDD when he returned to AT40 in 1998. Long Distance Dedications were dropped after Ryan Seacrest became host in 2004, but they continued as part of Kasem's adult contemporary countdowns.
 Top Three recaps: Beginning the weekend of February 24–25, 1979, a recap of the previous week's top three songs started off each AT40 episode. Originally all three songs would be played before the countdown began in earnest, but when time constraints became an issue, Kasem would simply announce the #3 and #2 songs and play only the #1 song, or just announce all three songs. By mid-1983, abbreviated recaps became the norm.
 #1's on other Billboard charts: Kasem gave a rundown on songs and albums that were #1 on other Billboard charts, such as country, soul/R&B, and dance/disco. These were typically announced during the Top 10, often before the #1 song on AT40. When Kasem relaunched the show in 1998, he brought this feature back albeit with the chart the show was currently using. However, it was limited to songs and only covered the Mediabase alternative, adult contemporary, and R&B charts.
 Predicting next week's #1 song: For a time in 1972 and 1973, following the week's #1 song, Kasem tried to predict what the #1 song would be on the following week's countdown, based on a poll of the AT40 staff. During the 46-week period that these predictions were used, the poll was successful only 22 weeks, and failed 24 weeks. The final song predicted, on the December 8, 1973, broadcast, was "The Most Beautiful Girl" by Charlie Rich, which was No. 1 the next week.
 Debut songs and songs falling out: In most countdowns, most commonly if #39 was a debut song or often with the first debut song after #40, Kasem would mention the number of songs that debut in the Top 40 and would then proceed to read off the list of songs that fell out of the countdown that week making room for the debuts.
 Great Radio Stations: Once an hour, generally halfway into the hour, Kasem relayed three or four radio stations that carried AT40, beginning each list with "American Top 40 is heard in the fifty states and around the world every week on great radio stations like ... ". In the first few years of the program, Casey said "coast to coast" instead of "in the fifty states." One foreign AT40 affiliate, or mention of Armed Forces Radio, was often included, usually as the last station in the list. In addition, new AT40 affiliates were mentioned at the top of one of the hours (never the first hour). The multiple station mentions became a regular feature in 1972; prior to then, only one station was mentioned per hour. The first station mentioned on AT40 was KMEN (now KKDD) in San Bernardino, California, on the August 29, 1970, program. Kasem would also do this for the spinoff versions of AT40 he did for adult contemporary stations.
 Special Reports: Occasionally, Kasem did a special report on a particular subject involving the music industry, usually related to a particular song or artist on the week's countdown. For example, when Musical Youth were in the countdown in 1983 with "Pass the Dutchie", he reported on the history of reggae music.
 Whatever happened to ... : Kasem periodically did a segment giving an update on an artist who had not been on the charts for some time.
 Oldies: During its first year, each AT40 show featured 3 or 4 "oldies", or chart-topping songs of the past. Normally, one old song aired per hour, which at the time mirrored the format of many Top 40 stations. Most of the oldies included were from the Rock 'N Roll era (post 1955). But occasionally, songs by pre-rock artists like Kay Starr, Perry Como or Nat King Cole were included. Each song was heavily promoted by Kasem and contained a story about the artist or some fact making it relevant to the contemporary audience. By the fall of 1971, only one old song appeared per show. The following year, the "oldie" feature was dropped altogether. Oldies were brought back to AT40 in the fall of 1975 under the title "AT40 Extra". But the feature was phased out again by the end of 1976. Old songs rarely appeared again until the "AT40 Archives" feature began in 1978. Today, some classic rock stations airing re-runs of these early shows will edit some of the "oldies" features out of the broadcast, as songs from the 1940s, 1950s and 1960s do not reflect the stations' mostly 1970s and 1980s music format.
 AT40 Archives: Once the show expanded to four hours, each of the first three hours ended with the "AT40 Archives" segment that looked back at number one songs of the past. From October 1978 to June 1980, the number one songs of the 1970s were featured in this segment, chronologically, and from June 1980 to November 1981 the number one songs of the 1960s were featured. The "AT40 Archives" feature ended in November 1981; for a short time in 1985, however, the show did feature a segment known as the "AT40 Hall of Fame", spotlighting a noteworthy artist (who may or may not have been charting that week).
 Commercial bumpers: Many commercial breaks generally had a singing jingle at the start and end of each one, known as a "split logo". At the start of the break was either "Casey's coast to coast" or "The hits from coast to coast"; both were used interchangeably. The end of the break was marked by the name of the program, "American Top 40". The bumpers were originally designed so that stations with no local ads at that point could continue straight to the next segment, with the bumpers changing to a mere jingle: "Casey's coast to coast ... American Top 40".
 Bumper music: The end of each hour's worth of programming was typically indicated by an approximately one-minute-long piece of nondescript bumper music. For the first few years of the program, it was merely the AT40 theme, but beginning in 1978, different pieces began to be used. Like the "number" jingles and the AT40 theme music, the bumpers were occasionally updated and re-recorded, but its only distinguishing feature was the occasional use of the AT40 theme as a leitmotif. The bumper music was typically and often cut short by the local station carrying the program, usually to give the station identification before starting the next hour, and was also used by stations to "pad out" the show so that it would always end on time. (The first weekend XM Satellite Radio played AT40 shows, the entire bumper music was played, as they were all played completely uncut, but later they played the station identification for the XM channels they were on.) When AT40 returned in 1998, the bumper music was preceded by a preview of the next song, and the lyrics "countin' down the hits with Casey Kasem" were added and played twice. The bumper was then followed by the station ID, with Kasem introducing the next song immediately after; this method was introduced in 1989 on his Westwood One program, Casey's Top 40, and carried over to AT40 upon his move to AMFM in 1998.
 Sign-off: After the #1 song was played, the bumper music began playing, and over that, Kasem typically reported that week's chart date and read the end credits, then signed off with what became his, and the show's, unofficial motto: "Keep your feet on the ground, and keep reaching for the stars." Beginning with the show of June 25, 1977, he usually added "and keep your radio tuned right where it is", as a way to help its affiliated stations improve listener loyalty; this phrase would be retired in 1984, but returned to the show when the AT40 brand name was revived in the late 1990s (Kasem had also used it on Casey's Top 40 and its Adult Contemporary-format spinoffs). Guest hosts would be prohibited from using Kasem's sign-off, but still used the "keep your radio tuned right where it is" phrase when its usage was in effect. Even his sign-on and sign-off music became popular, as "Shuckatoom" (composed by James R. Kirk) became a highly requested song, although it was never used apart from the show; "Shuckatoom" was first used to close AT40 with the "Top 40 Rock & Roll Acts of the 1950s" on October 4, 1975, and first used to open AT40 on November 8, 1975.

Although the show's format implied an average of ten countdown songs per hour (once the show had gone to a four-hour format), this was not rigidly enforced; however, by the mid-1980s, it had become increasingly rare for the final hour of the show to have any more than the top eleven or any fewer than the top nine songs left to play. The songs' run times determined how many would comfortably fit into each hour. The show bent to fit the Billboard rankings, and some songs had to be edited (in addition to whatever edits had been done for the single release), with a verse or chorus cut (usually for songs on their way out of the countdown), in order to fit into the show. But Kasem and his producers never lost sight of the stations carrying their show, and that the stories behind the songs were the chief reason that listeners tuned to AT40.

1988–95: Shadoe Stevens era
In 1988, Kasem left the show over contract concerns with ABC and signed with Westwood One to host a competing weekly countdown. Industry trade paper Billboard magazine reported that the main disputes between Kasem and Watermark/ABC were over his salary (which Westwood One tripled upon his signing), because of declining ratings and a smaller group of stations airing the show. Casey's final AT40 show, the 940th in the series, aired on August 6, 1988. At no point during that final show did Kasem ever let on that any changes were afoot. However, he closed the show by telling the audience to catch him on the television show America's Top 10 and did not plug the following week's AT40 (since December 19, 1987, he had always plugged both during his signoff). The #1 song during Casey's final show in the original AT40 era was "Roll with It" by Steve Winwood. The Moody Blues were the only artist included in both Casey's first and last countdown of the original show.

Kasem was replaced by Shadoe Stevens, whose first American Top 40 show aired on August 13, 1988, on 1,014 stations. To introduce Stevens to the audience, a two-minute cold open was recorded to start the show with Stevens making his way to the studio through the show's fictitious hall of history; Kasem was mentioned during the course of the open, as a "giant marble statue" of him helped guide Stevens to the studio. The change did not do much to stem the decline as loyal listeners did not take to Stevens as they had to Kasem.

Later, Stevens and AT40 lost a significant number of affiliates when, on January 21, 1989, Kasem's Westwood One show launched. The program, titled Casey's Top 40, used the weekly chart survey published by Radio & Records ("R&R", which is based on radio airplay) instead of the Billboard Hot 100 chart AT40 was still using (which at the time was based on record sales). Further complications arose when some stations that stayed with Stevens also added Kasem's new show.

In an attempt to win back an audience, AT40 tried new features, including interview clips, music news, top 5 flashbacks, and previews of upcoming chart hits (called the "AT40 Sneek Peek"). It also stopped using the Hot 100 chart, switching first to the Hot 100 Airplay chart and finally to the Mainstream Top 40 chart. Later still, the countdown would use what was called a "No Nuttin'" gimmick that drew criticism; at various points of the show, a song would start immediately after the jingle for its position on the chart was played and Stevens would not offer any commentary until it concluded.

ABC kept American Top 40 in its syndication lineup despite the continued lack of improvement in ratings, but in 1994 the network finally decided to look elsewhere. ABC announced it would be acquiring the Rick Dees Weekly Top 40, which was using the same charts that Casey's Top 40 was, and that they would no longer carry American Top 40 as a result. The final AT40 for ABC aired on July 9, 1994, five days after its twenty-fourth anniversary. Radio Express, founded by original show creator Tom Rounds, kept AT40 in production following the move by ABC as the program was still carried in foreign markets.Durkee, p. 165. It was under Radio Express that the show finally came to an end nearly seven months later in the remaining markets that were carrying it, which by this point consisted entirely of overseas affiliates.

The very last original AT40 aired on January 28, 1995, and it ended with an extended last segment. As usual, the No. 2 song on the chart led it off; that song was "Another Night" by Real McCoy, which had been the No. 1 song one week earlier. Stevens then took a moment to thank the listeners for their support over the previous twenty-four plus years and played one last Long Distance Dedication, sent by him to the fans. After going into depth about his potential choices, Stevens revealed his selection to be "(So Tired of Standing Still We Got to) Move On" by James Brown. Stevens then gave a rundown of how many songs had been played over the series' entire run to that point, with a final total of 552 chart toppers, including the one he was about to play as it returned to the top of the chart that week: "On Bended Knee" by Boyz II Men. As Stevens then read the credits and signed off for the final time, he played one final song. Perhaps appropriately, considering the circumstances, the song was "Happy Trails".

1998–2004: American Top 40 returns; second Casey Kasem era
As fate would have it, a chain of events happening approximately three years after the original American Top 40 came to an end would soon result in the return of the program to the airwaves with its original host at the helm.

When Casey Kasem left AT40 to join Westwood One, part of his exit agreement with ABC Radio involved their continued use of the branding after Shadoe Stevens took over the show. The terms were as follows.

If ABC had, at any point in the future, cancelled AT40 outright, they could hold onto the rights as long as:
they made an effort to revive the program (they didn't),
produced a special broadcast or promotion with the AT40 name (neither happened), or
continue paying rights fees to Kasem and co-creator Don Bustany.

In 1997, the agreement lapsed. Per the original terms of the arrangement, Kasem and Bustany's production company was to receive the rights to the branding. Although Bustany remained involved with AT40 for a brief period after Stevens took over, he did not remain there for very long and, following his departure from the show, he chose not to have any further involvement with the production. This resulted in Kasem gathering sole possession of the branding.

As this was going on, Kasem was about to end his eighth full year working for Westwood One after having re-signed with the network in 1993. The relationship, however, had significantly deteriorated over the previous four years. Over the course of that period, Westwood One had been acquired by Infinity Broadcasting, which was later absorbed into CBS Radio. Kasem was not pleased by what he perceived to be missed opportunities for cross promotion with other CBS properties as well as being treated as a less important figure than some of the other hosts on the network. Westwood One, meanwhile, had a series of issues of their own with Casey's Top 40; while the show was still successful, it had been dropped in both New York and Los Angeles, and the advertising revenue generated by the show did not justify the salary demands Kasem was making. The network also did not want to use the AT40 branding.

The sides eventually put aside their differences, with Westwood One deciding that losing Kasem to a competitor was not worth their trouble and Kasem signed on for one more year in December 1997. However, after the February 21, 1998, edition of his weekend countdowns, Kasem disappeared from the airwaves without notice and, unbeknownst to Westwood One, with no intention of returning to work.

Chancellor Media, the media company founded by Roy Masters, and Kasem began negotiations to relaunch AT40 for its newly launched syndication service called AMFM Radio Networks. A deal was finalized shortly after Kasem's abrupt departure from Westwood One where Chancellor would become owners of the AT40 franchise and Kasem would return to his creation as host. Westwood One was not happy with this development and filed a breach of contract lawsuit against Kasem, who claimed contractual vagueness gave him the right to seek employment elsewhere.

The revival of AT40 premiered the weekend of March 28, 1998, one week after Westwood One finally cancelled the three countdowns Kasem was hosting for them after four weeks without him. Chancellor also brought Kasem's AC countdowns to their network, with both now being branded as American Top 20 (see Spin-off programming below). Masters sold Chancellor/AMFM to Clear Channel Communications (the predecessor of what is now iHeartMedia) in 1999, at which point AT40 and other syndicated shows from AMFM Radio Networks were transferred into Premiere Radio Networks, which continues to syndicate the show as of today.

The resurrected American Top 40 kept the Radio and Records CHR/Pop chart previously used for Casey's Top 40 and was used as the basis for the show for the majority of this period. The only exception was a brief period from October 2000 to August 2001 when an obscure Mediabase chart was used. This chart had a rather ambiguous recurrent rule, which would see songs removed weekly from the chart from as high as No. 10, while that chart also resulted in songs that charted/peaked lower than No. 40 on Radio & Records pop charts to appear on the AT40 charts. By the time Kasem's last show aired, the show had gone back to using Mediabase's charts.

In December 2003, as part of a new deal with Premiere Radio Networks, Kasem announced that he would retire from hosting American Top 40 so he could focus on his duties hosting Hot AC and AC versions of the show, American Top 20. He also announced that the new host of AT40 would be Ryan Seacrest, an afternoon DJ host from KYSR who was rapidly gaining stardom from his hosting of the successful music reality TV show. American Idol.

Kasem's last show as host of AT40 aired on the weekend of January 3/4, 2004. His final No. 1 was Outkast's "Hey Ya!", which hit the top of the chart on the weekend of December 13, 2003.

2004–present: Ryan Seacrest era

On January 10, 2004, American Idol host Ryan Seacrest took over the hosting duties of American Top 40 from Kasem, although Kasem would continue to host American Top 20 and American Top 10 until his retirement in July 2009. With the host change, AT40 underwent a makeover, using a new theme song and introducing several new features. These extras included interviews with celebrities (which were not restricted to musical or countdown artists), a gossip section, and an update on movies screening in cinemas. Other extras inducted on a regular basis include "AT40 Breakout", a song predicted to crack the chart within the next few weeks (formerly known as the "Out of The Box" hit); "AT40 On The Verge" (an expansion of the AT40 Breakout; formerly known as the "Subway Fresh Buzz Song"), songs that are close towards entering the chart, many of which holding the position for multiple weeks; "Request Line", a segment in which Ryan Seacrest will play a song requested by a listener; "Double Play", a former hit from the artist just played; "AT40 Sleaze" (inspired by the "Dees Sleaze" segment of the Rick Dees Weekly Top 40 radio show); and "AT40 Rewind", a hit song from the past decade or so. In between songs, Seacrest and his guest hosts often make deadpan one-liners while writers and producers can be heard laughing frequently, including the security guard "Roger". Additionally, Seacrest initially opened most shows by playing the previous week's No. 1 song, as Kasem often did in the 1980s; this was discontinued after 2006, but in mid-2009 Seacrest began including a shorter recap segment in the show's introduction, in which he would play brief segments of the previous week's top three hits. In December 2004, the Hot AC version of the show debuted, giving both Seacrest and Kasem competing countdowns in the same format until 2009.

The show also began using a new chart that used no recurrent rule. On the first show with Ryan Seacrest, this led to several older songs reappearing after having dropped off many weeks earlier. Over the long term, it meant songs could spend long runs for about a year on the chart even after they went to recurrent status on other published charts. "Here Without You" by 3 Doors Down set a longevity record in 2004 for the CHR show by lasting 50 weeks before finally falling off. In 2006, "Scars" by Papa Roach would go on to tie the record. In 2011, Taio Cruz set AT40 all time longevity record with his song "Dynamite". This hit remained on the chart for 72 weeks, from July 2010 to November 2011. On the Hot AC version of AT40, "Use Somebody" by Kings of Leon set the all-time record in 2011 at 117 consecutive weeks. American Top 40 also became more interactive, involving online song voting and e-mail. In December 2006, the series' website was revamped, and the online song voting was discontinued in favor of publishing the Hot AC chart. The website also includes a toll-free number where fans can make requests and "shoutouts", as they would to a local radio station, and by 2009 replayed clips of shoutouts became part of the show. Online song voting was later reinstated, with results of votes on American Top 40s website factored into the chart rankings. AT40 was also expanded to social media through Twitter and Facebook where listeners from around the world will request a song to be included in the AT40 Extra segment, as well as their own mobile application which is available for free download on the Apple AppStore for iOS devices and on Google Play for Android devices.

In March 2010, Premiere Radio Networks announced that "American Top 5," a condensed daily top-5 countdown, would begin airing as part of the daily radio program On Air, also hosted by Seacrest.

In March 2016, the show underwent some minor changes. "Tell Me Something Good", a segment from Seacrest's weekday show On Air, was added to American Top 40. Additionally, any "extra" songs that aired during the show are announced by Seacrest before playing. The following month, the show resumed mentioning some of its affiliates around the world during the show.

When Seacrest was named the new co-host of Live with Kelly on May 1, 2017, he began to host the show from WHTZ in New York. Another studio near the Live with Kelly set was set up for On Air. Various guest hosts, however, will continue to do hosting duties from its original Hollywood studios when Seacrest is not around.

In February 2018, the show introduced new jingles with new voiceover artists replacing Dave Foxx and Kelly Doherty, who departed iHeartMedia (Premiere's parent company) in January.

In March 2020, amid the COVID-19 pandemic, Seacrest started to host AT40 from his house; the show also included pre-recorded messages from artists thanking healthcare workers and encouraging listeners to stay home, practice social distancing, and to keep in touch with loved ones.

In August 2020, the show rebranded their logo for the 50th anniversary. It features lines similar to those on the edges of vinyl records. It was changed again in September 2021;
 the same month, Premiere announced the show had been renewed through 2025 with Seacrest as host.

, American Top 40 is produced by Easton Allyn and Jennifer Sawalha, and engineered by James Rash.

Competition
American Top 40 has faced numerous competitors since its debut in 1970. These include The Weekly Top 30 with Mark Elliott (1979–1982); several Dick Clark-hosted shows starting in 1981 with the National Music Survey and Countdown America, the latter of which was originally hosted by former R&R CHR editor John Leader and later by Clark; Rockin' America Top 30 Countdown with then Z100 Program Director and personality Scott Shannon; and the Rick Dees Weekly Top 40, which has run continuously since 1983 with Rick Dees as host. Numerous other shows following the same format, both in the general top-40 category and in various specific radio formats, have aired over the course of AT40's history as well. In addition to Dees' show, Mario Lopez, Carson Daly, and (in overseas via World Chart Show) Mike Savage, all host competing countdown shows targeted at the pop top 40 market.

Reairing of older shows

AT40 flashback
From December 2000 to December 2002, many radio stations aired reruns of 1980–88 episodes under the title American Top 40 Flashback. The show was syndicated by Premiere Radio Networks. In its early weeks the shows were the original four-hour format of an American Top 40 episode, but after the first month and a half the show was reduced to three hours. Although the national syndication of American Top 40 Flashback ceased in December 2002, radio station WMMX in Dayton, Ohio, continued to carry American Top 40 Flashback on Saturday mornings until the premiere of Casey Kasem's 'American Top 40: The 80s.

Casey Kasem's American Top 40—the 70s and 80s
On August 4, 2006, XM Satellite Radio began replays of the original 1970s and 1980s AT40 shows with Casey Kasem that were digitally remastered from the original vinyl LPs and open-reel master tapes by Shannon Lynn of Charis Music Group. The event began with a weekend long marathon of original shows, with AT40 then being added as a regular show on two of XM's Decades channels, "The 70s on 7" and "The 80s on 8". With the merger of Sirius Satellite Radio and XM Satellite Radio, these AT40 shows began airing on both services on November 15, 2008. On the 70s on 7, it replaced the 'Satellite Survey', a Top 30 countdown of 1970s hits, produced by Sirius and hosted by Dave Hoeffel. On the 80s on 8, it replaced 'The Big 40' countdown produced by Sirius and hosted by Nina Blackwood. As of October 11, 2009, Sirius XM replaced the AT40 countdown on 80s on 8 and debuted a revised version of 'The Big 40' countdown now co-hosted by three of the five original MTV VJs: Nina Blackwood, Mark Goodman and Alan Hunter (Martha Quinn was a fourth co-host from 2009 to 2015).

Sirius XM "70s on 7" currently runs AT40 each Saturday at 12 pm with encore broadcasts the following Sunday at 9 am and at 12 midnight (Eastern Time). Most show dates roughly correspond to the current week in real time. A random episode is also featured on J.J.Walker's show on "70s on 7" Thursdays at 9 pm ET. The mix of AT40 episodes being run on XM include the year-end countdowns, which are typically run in two parts: the first half (#100-#51) in one time slot, and then the second half (#50-#1) in the following time slot. The AT40 specials are also part of XM's rotation; for instance, "AT40 Goes to the Movies" aired prior to the 2007 Academy Awards, and on February 24, "The Top 40 Acts of the 80s So Far" aired on XM 80s the first week of July 2007. Also, "The Top 40 Songs of the Disco Era (1974–1979)" aired on Sirius XM "70s on 7" the second weekend of July 2011. As of the weekend of February 11, 2023, the 6am and noon Saturday editions were discontinued and replaced by a single 9am Saturday airing, with the Sunday airing moved to noon Eastern time. 

From October through early November 2006, oldies radio station KQQL in Minneapolis/St. Paul, which is owned by iHeartMedia, ran a series of American Top 40 episodes from the 1970s. Aside from one week, when the station attempted to air a four-hour episode from 1979 in the three-hour time slot (resulting in the show getting cut off at No. 11 and the top 10 not being heard), this test run was largely successful. Because of the success, Premiere Radio Networks decided to launch "Casey Kasem's American Top 40: The 1970s" into national syndication featuring the three-hour shows from 1970 to 1978, and the last three hours of shows originally aired from October 1978 through December 1979. (One original four-hour program, first aired in October 1978, was edited into a three-hour program for re-airing in 2007, and the four-hour "Disco Hits" special from July 1979 with the first hour optional was aired in 2008, but until the fall of 2010, no other program from the last 15 months of the 1970s was included in the "AT40: The 70s" package. Starting in late 2010, Premiere began airing three-hour versions of four-hour AT40s from 1978 to 1979, beginning the broadcasts at the start of the countdown's second hour; during the spring of 2012, Premiere began making the first hour of these programs "optional," meaning that stations can choose to air all four hours of the four-hour programs, or just the last three.) Starting in 2012, whenever programs from 1970 to 1972 were scheduled to air, Premiere began offering affiliates the option of airing a later 1970s program instead (typically, a corresponding year from seven years later, or 1977–1979).

The 1980s version premiered on April 8, 2007, replacing the American Top 40 Flashback reruns. The shows are available in either their full original four-hour format, or an abbreviated three-hour version that omits the first hour of the show. To date, the latest program to air as part of the "AT40: The 80s" package has been August 6, 1988 – Kasem's last show with the original program. Because the rights to Shadoe Stevens-era episodes were held by Cumulus Media, no programs from August 13, 1988, to 1995 have been re-aired as part of this or any similar block.

To date, the only re-aired classic AT40 programs that featured a host other than Kasem are the shows of March 25, 1972, with Dick Clark as host; September 12, 1981, with Gary Owens as host; and May 13, 1978, and July 17, 1982, both with Mark Elliott as host. All were aired as tributes after Clark's, Owens' and Elliott's deaths, respectively.

Newly produced extra segments hosted by voiceover talent Larry Morgan are available for use at stations' discretion. Prior to Casey leaving Premiere Radio, these segments were hosted by his son Mike; when the series first began, these segments were hosted by one of Casey's former guest hosts, Ed McMann. These extra segments are also heard on the 80s show. KQQL was the first to sign on, airing programs beginning on December 30, 2006. Typically, the "optional extras" were songs that had yet to enter the top 40 of the Hot 100. However, some songs never reached the top 40 but had since become popular at classic hits/oldies/classic rock stations or certain novelty songs that were popularized by certain media events like the Who shot J.R.? cliffhanger (recorded by Gary Burbank) and the Chicago Bears 1985–86 NFC win and the team itself recording a rap tune about going to the Super Bowl, while others were tributes to performers who had just died. For early 1970s programs, some of the "optional extras" were actually extras (i.e., "oldies") that were originally a part of the original program; in this case, Kasem's original commentary and introduction of the song were kept intact, in lieu of Morgan's voiceover.

In March 2008, XM Satellite Radio rebranded the XM broadcasts with the "Casey Kasem's American Top 40" name and logo used for terrestrial broadcasts, although XM still aired the commercial-free broadcasts, while Premiere Radio carries edited and recut broadcasts with commercials. Following the merger of Sirius and XM, the AT40 shows airing on those platforms have occasionally been edited. In some cases, extras and LDDs have been cut from the original broadcasts.

Sirius XM 70s on 7 aired the inaugural AT 40 (which originally aired July 4, 1970) on July 4, 2013, as part of a special July 4 broadcast.

As of 2017, American Top 40: The 70s & 80s are produced by Toby James Petty and engineered by Shannon Lynn, both of whom had been members of the current AT40 production staff prior to Kasem's 2004 departure.

As of 2014, American Top 40: The 70s shows that were originally produced in mono are being converted to true stereo by Ken Martin, a program director and disk jockey for AT40 affiliate WTOJ in Carthage, New York. With some 1970s episodes featuring songs that were originally further edited by Watermark staff, Martin restored those songs to their original broadcast length; many of these extended editions were broadcast exclusively on Martin's station, WTOJ.

As of 2019, shows from the 1970s and 1980s are airing continually, without commercials, on the iHeartRadio station "Classic American Top 40". Most of iHeart's branded stations use an HD Radio subchannel in one of their markets to originate their app-only stations, and in this case, WMMX-HD2 in Dayton, Ohio, carries it over-the-air in that market.

As of April 2020, rebroadcast shows are currently aired on 200 radio stations in 7 countries and every U.S. state except Montana. Foreign rebroadcast shows are heard in four of the eastern provinces of Canada, as well as the American Forces Network, Australia, Bangalore, Berlin, Aruba, Hyderabad, Mozambique, and the United Kingdom.

Chart data used by American Top 40

Billboard magazine
AT40 used the top 40 songs from the Billboard Hot 100 singles chart from the show's inception in 1970 to November 23, 1991. The chart was widely regarded as the industry standard for tracking the popularity of singles, and was thus a natural choice to be used. Kasem would frequently announce during the show that Billboard was the only source for the countdown. While using these charts worked well for the first half of the 1970s, as music changed during the decade and disco became popular on the charts, some rock stations began to drop the show because of complaints from program directors that AT40 was playing too many songs not normally heard on their stations.

This gradually became a wide schism as rock splintered into several formats in the early 1980s. As a result, AT40'''s weekly playlist could be very diverse in the styles and formats of the songs played. Historians have noted that no one station actually played all of the songs on the Billboard Hot 100 list, because they represented overlapping formats, such as hard rock, mainstream rock, heavy metal, dance, new wave, punk, rap, pop, easy listening/adult contemporary and country. Stations tended to specialize in only one or two of these formats and completely ignore the others.

One solution for the AT40 producers was to air frequent specials (at least three or four times a year) that concentrated on the classic music of the past, such as Rock in the Movies and Top Hits of the Seventies. But as Top 40 stations evolved into CHR, they began to avoid syndicated shows like AT40, preferring to stick with their own special niche formats.

By the early 1990s, many singles, mostly of the rap, heavy metal or grunge genres, reached the chart based on strong sales despite low airplay; several were very long, others were too controversial or risqué for mainstream airplay (for instance, the sexually explicit "Me So Horny" by 2 Live Crew made it to No. 26 on the Hot 100 in 1989). These songs would generally only be aired in brief snippets during the show.

Because of this, American Top 40 switched to the Hot 100 Airplay chart (then known as the Top 40 Radio Monitor). These songs generally scored much higher radio airplay, and some were not even released as singles (such as "Steel Bars" by Michael Bolton). During this time, a few songs made very high debuts, including two that almost debuted in the No. 1 spot: "I'll Be There" by Mariah Carey, which entered at No. 4, and "Erotica" by Madonna, which entered at No. 2.

In January 1993, American Top 40 switched charts again, this time to the Billboard Top 40 Mainstream chart. This chart had more mainstream hits but fewer urban, dance and rap songs.

AT40 did not always use the official year-end Billboard chart during the 25 years in which the show used Billboard charts. In 1972, 1973 and 1977, as well as 1980–1984 and 1990–1994, AT40 compiled its own year-end chart. These charts were often close to Billboard's, but AT40 would use a mid-December to early-December time period while Billboard's survey year varied from year to year. AT40 matched Billboard's No. 1 year-end song every year except 1977, 1984, 1990 and 1993.

Radio and Records magazine
With the show's revival in 1998, a new chart was implemented, the top 40 portion of Radio and Records CHR/Pop top 50 chart, which was already in use on Casey's Top 40. This chart used a recurrent rule that removed songs below No. 25 that had exceeded 26 weeks in the top 50; these removals, if they occurred in the top 40, would be reflected on the appropriate week's program. In 1999, the rule was modified to further restrict long chart runs: songs falling below #20 with at least 20 weeks in the top 50 would now be removed.

On October 21, 2000, American Top 40 began using an unpublished chart on a weekly basis for the first time in its history. The chart seemed to be a variant of the CHR/Pop chart provided by Mediabase, the data provider to Radio & Records. The most noticeable feature of this new chart was its ambiguous recurrent rule. Songs would be removed regularly from within the top 15, seemingly regardless of the number of weeks they had spent on the chart. Additionally, the chart has resulted in songs that otherwise peaked at #41–50 on R&R's charts appearing on the AT40 charts. This chart lasted until August 11, 2001, when AT40 returned to the Radio & Records pop chart. The return coincided with another modification in the recurrent rule; songs would be removed below No. 25 after three consecutive weeks without a bullet (an increase in radio plays). This change would be short-lived, as in November 2001, Radio & Records returned to the 20 weeks/below No. 20 rule, which remained in place for the remainder of Kasem's tenure.

 Spin-off programming 
Adult Contemporary countdowns

When Casey Kasem joined what was then AMFM Radio Networks, he had been doing two weekly countdowns for adult contemporary formatted stations. Both of these shows would find a home with him at his new syndicator and were rebranded once he joined. Both shows took the name American Top 20 (AT20) and launched the same weekend as Kasem's new AT40. He would concurrently host both shows with AT40 until he handed the show over to Ryan Seacrest in January 2004, then continue as host of the AC countdowns until he retired in 2009. After Kasem retired, the Hot AC American Top 20 and the Adult Contemporary American Top 10 were discontinued.

In December 2004, Premiere Networks launched a version of Seacrest's AT40 for the same hot adult contemporary stations that AT20 had been targeting. Although such a move made AT20 redundant, Premiere continued to offer Hot AC countdowns hosted by both Kasem (AT20) and Seacrest (AT40) from December 2004 thru July 2009.

Television spinoff

From 1980 to 1992, a video version of the show entitled America's Top 10 was aired in syndication to television stations across the United States. Kasem hosted this version from 1980 to 1989. When Kasem left American Top 40 in 1988, he remained as host of America's Top 10 until the end of 1989, when he would be replaced by Siedah Garrett and later Tommy Puett. Kasem returned by 1991, and the show ran until 1992.

Other formats
Based on the success of American Top 40, Kasem and Don Bustany created a spinoff top 40 countdown for Watermark for Country Radio called American Country Countdown, patterned after Kasem's program. "ACC" premiered in 1973, and was hosted by Don Bowman from its inception until April 1978. Bob Kingsley replaced Bowman and hosted until the end of 2005, after which Kix Brooks of the late country music duo Brooks & Dunn took over; Brooks has been hosting ACC since. Kingsley later moved to another program, Country Top 40 (abbreviating, not coincidentally, as "CT40"), which follows the same format as AT40 and ACC; Kingsley died on Thursday, October 17, 2019. Both ACC and CT40 remain on the air: ACC on Westwood One and CT40, now hosted by Fitz, syndicated by Hubbard Broadcasting.

After Kasem left ABC, the network launched American Gold, a spinoff oldies countdown (featuring far fewer songs, and often focusing on a particular artist) hosted by Dick Bartley. American Gold's last show aired at the end of March 2009, replaced with another show hosted by Bartley for United Stations Radio Networks, Classic Countdown.

The American Top 40 format was adapted in an Australian show titled Take 40 Australia, similarly counting down the top 40 songs in the country.

 Syndication 
In the United States, American Top 40 is available in almost every radio market in the USA. It had at least one radio station in every state up until December 2022 when New Jersey-based WHCY converted to country music. As of December 2022, New Jersey and Rhode Island are the only two states that don't have a local station carrying American Top 40. Rhode Island can pick up the show either from Connecticut's WKSS or Boston's WXKS-FM. North Jersey can still receive the show either from New York's WHTZ or the Lehigh Valley's WAEB. The following list is of the stations outside of the 50 states. Their times are for the station's broadcast areas.

 Sun 107 FM in Honduras airs the show to the Bay Islands and Atlántida Departments every Sunday morning
 The Black Star Radio Network (4NPR), which has several frequencies across Australia's Far North Queensland region, broadcasts the Hot AC version of the show every Saturday at noon.
 Antenna 8 in Panama airs the show every Saturday at noon. Like Australia's 4NPR, Antena 8 airs the Hot AC version of the show
 In Phnom Penh, Cambodia the show airs on 97.5 Love FM Saturday mornings and Sunday nights.
 Until 2021, China's Hit FM aired the show every Saturday morning at 8.
 2 stations in Mexico (D99 in Monterrey, and El Lobo 106.1 in Chihuahua) air the show on Saturday afternoons. D99 rebroadcasts the last hour every Monday and Friday morning at 9, and El Lobo 106.1 rebroadcasts the entire show every Monday night.
 101.3 Blue Radio in Ecuador airs the show three times a week (Friday afternoons at 1, Saturday mornings at 10, and Sunday afternoons at 4).
 Sri Lanka's TNL Radio aired the show midday every Saturday and Wednesday.
 104.7 the Beat in American Samoa airs the show Saturday mornings and Sunday nights.
 Amber Sound FM in Derbyshire, UK airs the show every Sunday afternoon.
 Hi FM broadcasts the show across Oman. every Friday morning at 10, and Saturday afternoon at 4. The breakout tracks and extras are omitted from their broadcast.
 104.4 Virgin Radio provides the show to Dubai every Friday and Saturday.
 More than 50 Canadian stations air AT40, most being owned by IHeartRadio Canada and Golden West Broadcasting. MOVE Radio stations in Canada air the show as 'Move Radio's Exclusive AT40' with some songs omitted and replaced with songs by Canadian artists. In 2021, Ontario-based station 91.5 CKPR added a special Hot AC version of the chart that included contemporary Canadian artists. This is done to follow Canadian broadcast regulations. Other Canadian stations like Kraze 101.3, and 94.3 CKSY omit the optional extras.
 In India, the show airs on Bengaluru's Indigo 91.9 FM, Hyderabad's Kool 104, and on the "Radio One 94.3" network.
 The show airs on two stations in Uganda; 94.8 XFM and Radio West. Both air the show middays every Saturday morning at 10 am and 9 am respectively. Radio West omits both the optional extras and break-outs
 The show airs every Sunday morning at 8 in Singapore on Kiss 92FM.
 The show airs in Papua New Guinea on 96NAU Sunday mornings at 10.
 The show airs Friday afternoons on Egypt's Nile FM.
Brunei's Kristal FM airs the countdown every Saturday afternoon. This station occasionally omits certain songs on the chart because of their lyrical content and delays the last hour of the show.
With the help of the American Forces Network (AFN), the show is broadcast every Saturday to several military bases in more than 120 countries. Most NATO-owned military bases in Europe and Asia have FM frequencies that also broadcast to surrounding cities such as Naples, Seoul, and Brussels. A digital radio network from AFN, called Direct-to-Sailors (DTS) broadcasts the show to several US Navy vessels.
 The show also streams worldwide on the iHeartRadio app, which can also be accessed through the chart's own website (AmericanTop40.com). The station updates the new chart every Friday at around 4 am Eastern Time (10 AM GMT).

Censorship, offensive songs and affiliate standards
Casey Kasem and Watermark's policy regarding putting American Top 40 together was to always play the forty most popular songs in the United States and never to ban a record from the countdown. However, whenever songs with potentially offensive lyrical content made the top 40, Watermark would send out memos to affiliated stations alerting them of the presence of that song in the countdown and sometimes provide stations with suggestions on how to edit the song out of their AT40 broadcasts.

When the show became part of Premiere Networks since 1998, a few stations airing AT40 (especially in most countries around the world) were opted to either change versions of each songs or skipped some portions of the show for various reasons.

Offensive content
The first song to receive this advisory was in April and May 1971, with a spoken word piece, "The Battle Hymn of Lt. Calley", by Terry Nelson and C-Company.oldradioshows.com: Casey Kasem's American Top 40, 4/24/71. Retrieved on November 26, 2008. This song would chart in the high-30s for four weeks, dropping out after May 15, 1971. Some better-known songs which received this treatment included "Kodachrome" by Paul Simon, "Roxanne" by The Police, "Ain't Love a Bitch" by Rod Stewart, and "Paradise by the Dashboard Light" by Meat Loaf.

Perhaps the most infamous of these songs was Chuck Berry's number-one hit "My Ding-a-Ling", which put some stations in the odd position of having to air AT40 without playing the number one song; at least one station, KELI in Tulsa, Oklahoma, censored out the song at its No. 1 position, replacing it with a message from station management, explaining why they chose to censor the program. The censorship of this song continued even into the twenty-first century; some stations, such as WOGL in Philadelphia, replaced this song with an optional extra when it aired a rerun of the November 18, 1972, broadcast (where it ranked at #14) on December 6, 2008.

In the summer of 1977, radio station KRNQ in Des Moines, Iowa, edited out "The Killing of Georgie" by Rod Stewart, because of the subject matter of a homosexual being murdered; that song peaked at No. 30 on the countdown.

In 1978, when Billy Joel's "Only the Good Die Young" (wherein Joel urged pre-marital sex by a teen Catholic girl, Virginia) was on the charts, AT40 had placed warnings in shipments to warn affiliates in highly Catholic populated areas along with a special break in the countdown for stations to substitute another song in its place. The affiliates usually used the suggestion, though some did not and no major complaints were ever heard. (Many of these memos have been reprinted in Pete Battistini's book, "American Top 40 with Casey Kasem: The 1970s".)

In situations where a charting song contained offensive language and the record company was unable to provide AT40 with a clean edit of the song, the producers would often make an edit themselves. Such was a case with Bob Dylan's Top 40 single, "George Jackson", which peaked at #33 in January 1972 and appeared for two weeks on AT40. The offensive lyric in the song was, "He wouldn't take shit from no one." To rectify the problem, AT40 engineer Bill Hergonson edited the lyric, which was now heard as "He wouldn't take it from no one." A similar situation occurred again in July 1975, when The Isley Brothers' "Fight the Power" was in the Top 40, but in this case, the substitute version provided by the group's label was unsuitable, resorting to the engineer to substitute grunts and extra drum beats over the offending parts of the original record. However, this was not before AT40 erroneously played the uncensored version (with the lyric "...by all this bullshit goin' down") the first two weeks on the chart, on the July 12 and 19, 1975 editions.

Songs with offensive words in their titles were often censored for radio airplay, and is reflected in their inclusion on AT40. In 2011, three such songs made it to the #1 position on AT40: "Fuck You" by CeeLo Green (changed to "Forget You"), "Fuckin' Perfect" by Pink (changed to "Perfect"), and "Tonight (I'm Fuckin' You)" by Enrique Iglesias (changed to "Tonight (I'm Lovin' You)"). Other notable songs included "Niggas in Paris" by Jay-Z & Kanye West (becoming "In Paris", peaking at #5), "Ass Back Home" by Gym Class Heroes (became "Get Yourself Back Home", peaking at #12), "I Don't Fuck With You" by Big Sean featuring E-40 (became "I Don't Mess With You," peaking at #34), "Fuck U Betta" by Neon Hitch (becoming "Love U Betta" and peaking at #29; this song was also first played in Subway's Fresh Buzz Song of the Week), and Bella Poarch's "Build a Bitch" (became "Build a B", peaking at #27).

In 2000, "Sexual (Li Da Di)" by Amber and "The Bad Touch" by Bloodhound Gang debuted on AT40 without any censorship despite both songs' context referring to sexual activity. The songs peaked at No. 25 and No. 21 respectively. That same year, the show also used a slightly suggestive version of soulDecision's "Faded" (which peaked at #6), despite a more radio-friendly version of the song being available.

In the 2011 fun. song "We Are Young", the word "higher" is censored from the first verse.

In the 2012 Bruno Mars' song "Locked Out of Heaven", the word "sex" is censored from the pre-chorus.

In 2015, The Chainsmokers's "Roses" (feat. ROZES), Travis Scott's "Antidote", Halsey's "New Americana", and Alessia Cara's "Here" had been edited by censoring one of their chorus in the lyrics dealt with prohibited drugs. In 2018, Khalid's "Young Dumb & Broke" was similarly censored, with the lyric "I'm so high at the moment" being completely edited out of the song because of references to drugs. However, on some versions of the show, the lyric was not censored.

In 2017, Jason Derulo's "Swalla" (feat. Nicki Minaj and Ty Dolla $ign) also had its chorus heavily censored because the context of the title referred to oral sex. However, the title of the song was announced without being censored, presumably because Ty Dolla $ign uses the title lyric to refer to drinking during his verse in the song.

In 2018, N.E.R.D and Rihanna's "Lemon" was significantly edited. An alternative version of the song was played, which had the final two verses of the song played on loop. This is presumably to remove the first two verses, in which the lyrics included highly charged political issues such as immigration, racism and anti-Donald Trump sentiments.

In 2019, the chorus of Fletcher's "Undrunk" was edited because of lyrics about masturbation. Later that year, Ed Sheeran and Khalid's "Beautiful People" was edited with the line "Champagne and rolled-up notes" being replaced with the second line in the chorus, as well as Jonas Brother's "Only Human" having the word "drunk" removed/swapped from the chorus.

In 2020, BENEE and Gus Dapperton's song "Supalonely" was edited because of drinking references in its lyrics. Later that year, Taylor Swift's song "Cardigan" was edited because of drinking references in its lyrics, replacing the word "bars" with "cars", the same thing happened in 2019 with the Jonas Brothers' song "Sucker".

In 2021, the words 'drug(s)' and 'suicide' were censored in Nessa Barrett and Jxdn's song "La Di Die." Also that same year, several words from Doja Cat's "Need to Know" were removed because of references to sexual activity.

In 2022, Charlie Puth's song "Light Switch", the word "dirty" is censored from the first verse.

In 2023, SZA’s song “Kill Bill” was edited to censor the words “kill” and “killed”. The same edits were also done on the official radio version of the song.

Unannounced titles
Although Kasem never banned a song from the countdown, there was at least one instance in which the title wasn't always said. When George Michael's "I Want Your Sex" hit the Billboard charts in the summer of 1987, Kasem and a sub host, Charlie Van Dyke occasionally failed to announce the name of the song; only its artist (e.g., "George Michael's latest hit is up five notches this week..."). There was a few occasions it was said however. Also, as had been done with previous controversial hits, because of the song's suggestiveness, the show's structure was altered slightly, so stations could opt out of the song. This pattern was also evident during the 1987 Year End countdown. The song title was mentioned five times during its chart run (June 20, 1987; June 27, 1987; April 7, 1987; December 9, 1987, and September 19, 1987), during the week-ending episode of September 26, 1987, when it dropped out of the Top 40, and during the Top 100 of 1987 show; Shadoe Stevens, his successor, however did mention the title on the show from July 31, 1993, as part of the Flashback feature, as it was in the top 5 from that week in 1987. In the spring of 1991, when "People Are Still Having Sex" by LaTour and "I Wanna Sex You Up" by Color Me Badd debuted the same week, their titles were announced in full.

Another song that had its title unannounced after its first week was "Me So Horny" by 2 Live Crew, in the fall of 1989 (the Shadoe Stevens era). It was mentioned twice at the beginning of the song, and back announced once, its debut week. For the rest of its chart run, the title was never again mentioned. When 2 Live Crew returned to the top 40 in the Summer of 1990, with "Banned in the U.S.A.", Shadoe did mention that it was the follow-up to "Me So Horny". The song did come with edit out instructions for stations as well. Other songs around that time with edit out warnings were "The Humpty Dance" by The Digital Underground, and "Tic Tac Toe" by Kyper.

In 2018, "God is a Woman" by Ariana Grande had its title not mentioned and its chorus edited in some airings of the show in some Middle Eastern countries, presumably because of religious beliefs; despite this some radio stations such as Hi FM in Oman play the song in its entirety during normal programming.

Lengthy songs and double-sided hits
Very rarely was a song on that week's chart excluded from that week's AT40, if so only because of time considerations—on an edition that aired the weekend of December 19, 1970, The Guess Who's "Share the Land", which ranked at No. 30 that week, was omitted from AT40, to play both sides of that week's No. 1 Double A-side hit, George Harrison's "My Sweet Lord" / "Isn't It a Pity". Normally when a Double A-side appeared on the charts, one side was played one week, with the other played the next week, alternating each week as long as it was in the Top 40. Similar omissions occurred in February 1974 when both the Gordon Sinclair and Byron MacGregor versions of The Americans simultaneously hit the Top 40; in each case, only one version was played each week alternately.

Don McLean's 1971 hit American Pie, which was 8:33 long, was split into two segments for the single release. When the song aired on AT40, they usually played a promo edit which ran around 4:20, with the entire song played when it reached No. 1 and on another occasion when it was dropping off the charts.

In early 2013, Justin Timberlake's single "Mirrors" had to be edited for time, as the song is over eight minutes long.

In 2017, Harry Styles' single "Sign of the Times" was also edited for time. The original song is over 5 minutes long.

In 2021, AT40 played the original version of Billie Eilish's single "Happier Than Ever", which is 4:58 long, although most affiliates played the radio version, which is 3:09.

In 2022, "AT40" played the original version of Steve Lacy's single "Bad Habit", which is 3:52 long, although most affiliates played the radio version, which is 2:45.

Remixes and alternative versions of charted songs
On several occasions, the show would play remixed versions of charted songs. Notable examples included Enya's "Only Time", LeAnn Rimes' "Can't Fight the Moonlight", Mikaila's "So In Love With Two", Whitney Houston's "It's Not Right but It's Okay" and "My Love Is Your Love" among others.

In 2001 and 2002, AT40 played the original versions of Joe's "Stutter", Jennifer Lopez's "I'm Real" and Samantha Mumba's "Baby Come on Over", in which airplay was given for remixed versions of each song.

Some time during its run on the CHR chart, AT40 aired (and still airs as an occasional extra) the Tiësto remix of John Legend's All of Me, despite some affiliates airing the original 4-minute song.

In 2018, AT40 played the original version of Halsey’s “Alone”, despite the remix version featuring Big Sean and Stefflon Don receiving airplay.

In 2019, AT40 played the original version of Lil Nas X's "Old Town Road", despite the remix version with Billy Ray Cyrus receiving airplay.

During a portion of its run in 2020, AT40 played the Arty remix of Surf Mesa's "ily", despite most of its affiliates airing the original version; it was eventually switched to the original version when the song entered the Hot AC chart.

In 2021, AT40 played the original version of All Time Low's "Monsters", despite the remix version with Blackbear and Demi Lovato being serviced to Top 40 radio, while the original version was serviced to Alternative rock stations. Later that year, AT40 continued to play the original version of The Weeknd's "Save Your Tears" (released in 2020), despite some affiliates playing the remixed version with Ariana Grande on Top 40 radio when it was released in April of that year.

When Dua Lipa’s song "Levitating" first hit AT40 in October 2020, the remix version featuring DaBaby was played as it was sent to Top 40 stations. However, after DaBaby made controversial comments at Rolling Loud Miami in late July 2021, many radio stations replaced the remix version of "Levitating" with the original solo version that was already on Future Nostalgia with AT40 following suit in the week-ending August 7, 2021, edition (although this did not affect the Hot AC chart as it was already playing that version); in addition, DaBaby's verse was also edited out from DJ Khaled’s song "I Did It". Almost two years later on the week-ending March 5, 2023 edition, AT40 played the solo mix of "Camila Cabello"'s song "My Oh My", removing DaBaby's verse on the CHR edition as an optional extra though it also doesn't affect Hot AC as it was already playing that version.

In late 2021, American Top 40 played the original version of Wizkid’s song "Essence", featuring Tems, despite the remix version featuring Justin Bieber receiving airplay on some affiliates.

In 2022, American Top 40 played the solo version of Imagine Dragons' "Enemy", even though most affiliates played the original version featuring JID, although the solo version is more commonly played on affiliates in the Asia-Pacific region. In the same year, AT40 played the no rap edit of Ed Sheeran’s "2step" even when many affiliated stations played the original version featuring Lil Baby. Also in the same year, AT40 played the original version of Stephen Sanchez's "Until I Found You", despite some affiliates playing the remix version featuring Em Beihold. By March 2023, some affiliates that played the original version of the song switched over to playing the remix version.

In 2023, despite the release of the remix version of the song with Ariana Grande on February 24 that year, American Top 40 still continued to play the original version of The Weeknd’s “Die for You,” which was originally released in late 2016. In March 2023, American Top 40 plays the original version of PinkPantheress "Boy's a Liar" although many affiliates play the remix version of "Boy's a Liar Pt. 2" featuring Ice Spice.

Disco and rap
As has been mentioned previously, many rock radio stations in the late 1970s adopted anti-disco stances, and this, too, was reflected in the way some affiliates edited AT40. For example, one 1979 show featured a story about disco saving New York; again, the show was structured so that anti-disco stations could edit the story out of the show. (Notably, Kasem ended the monologue with the prediction that "disco is here to stay," which was proven false in short order, as disco rapidly fell out of fashion by 1980.)

More famously, on the weekend of July 7–8, 1979, Cleveland, Ohio AT40 affiliate WGCL (now WNCX), instead of carrying AT40s "Top 40 Disco Songs" special because of being an anti-disco radio station, did its own version of American Top 40 using the July 7, 1979, Billboard chart as the source with Townsend Coleman handling the hosting duties for Casey Kasem. The special Cleveland-only American Top 40 episode did not feature the AT40 Archives, extras, or Long Distance Dedications – just the top 40 singles of that week, which was preceded by a recap of the previous week's top three. This version was also presented live on the air, unlike AT40, which was produced and recorded several days in advance. Because the station did not have disco songs in the playlist, and the top 40 that week had several disco songs, WGCL had to reach outside its library to find copies of some of the songs, some of which were not the single versions; "Hot Stuff" and "Bad Girls" by Donna Summer, the songs occupying the No. 3 and No. 2 spots on the Billboard chart for that week respectively, were conveniently available as a 12-inch medley, which Coleman used for the show. Through clever editing, Coleman also took the "Casey's Coast to Coast" jingle (pronounced "K-C's Coast to Coast") and spliced in a "T," to provide an appropriate "TC's Coast to Coast" jingle. Kasem himself did not learn about the deception until 1996, laughing the whole thing off by saying, "Maybe I don't want to hear it!"

Coleman's sleight-of-hand was actually the second time a version of the AT40 had aired that was not quite on the up and up. According to Rob Durkee's book "American Top 40: The Countdown of the Century", Dave Morgan of WDHF (now WCHI-FM) in Chicago ghosted an edition of the program sometime in the summer of 1975. When the station's copy of the show did not arrive in time, he used Billboards list and merely played the records, apparently heavily implying that the show was American Top 40 without actually identifying it as such. "My program director made me do it!" Morgan said years later. The following year, WDHF would refuse to play AT40s "Fourth of July's Greatest Hits" special, because No. 1 hits from the pre-rock era were overabundant in the special. But while the special was a stark departure from the contemporary sound of the 1970s, Tom Rounds in his press release reminded stations that it was the United States' "one and only bicentennial."

From 1992 to 1994, two radio stations still carrying American Top 40 had to carry customized versions of the show. WPLJ in New York City aired the show with the urban/dance/rap songs mentioned but not played and were replaced here and there by Hot Adult Contemporary-leaning extras. KUBE in Seattle, Washington, aired AT40 with a few songs that did not fit the station's Top 40 Rhythm format omitted each week.

Special Countdowns
Occasionally American Top 40 airs special countdowns in place of the regular American Top 40 countdown show. These included1:
 "Top 40 Recording Acts of the Rock Era 1955–1971" (Weekend of May 1–2, 1971)
 "Top 40 Christmas Songs" (Weekend of December 25–26, 1971)
 "Top 40 Songs of the Rock Era 1955–1972" (weekend of July 1–2, 1972)
 "Top 40 Albums of the Week" (weekend of August 5–6, 1972; the Top 40 singles were also counted down alongside that week's albums)
 "Top 40 Artists from Sept 1, 1967, to Sept 1, 1972" (weekend of September 30 – October 1, 1972)
 "Top 40 Songs from March 1968 to March 1973" (weekend of April 7–8, 1973)
 "Top 40 Disappearing Acts" (weekend of July 7–8, 1973)
 "Top 40 Recording Acts of the Rock Era 1955–1973" (weekend of October 6–7, 1973)
 "Top 40 Christmas Songs" (weekend of December 22–23, 1973)
 "Top 40 Hits of British Artists 1955–1974" (weekend of April 6–7, 1974)
 "Top 40 Acts of the 1970s, So Far" (weekend of July 6–7, 1974)
 "Top 10 Producers of the 1970s" (weekend of October 5–6, 1974)
 "Top 40 Disappearing Acts" (weekend of April 1–2, 1975)
 "Top 40 Rock 'n' Roll Acts of the 1950s" (weekend of October 4–5, 1975)
 "Bicentennial Special: #1 July 4 Songs of the Past 40 Years" (weekend of July 3–4, 1976)
 "Top 40 Songs of the 'Beatle Years'[1964–1970]" (weekend of October 2–3, 1976)
 "Top 40 Girls of the Rock Era 1955–1977" (weekend of July 2–3, 1977)
 "Top 40 Movie Songs 1960–1978" (weekend of Apr 4–5, 1978)
 "Top 40 Acts of the 1970s, So Far" (weekend of Jul 1–2, 1978)
 "The Top 40 Songs of the Disco Era 1974–1979" (weekend of July 7–8, 1979)
 "The Top 50 Songs of the 1970s" (weekend of January 5–6, 1980)
 "AT40 Book of Records" (weekend of July 5–6, 1980)
 "Top 40 Hits of the Beatles: Together and Apart" (weekend of July 4–5, 1981)
 "Top 40 Acts of the 1980s, So Far" (weekend of July 2–3, 1983)
 "Giants of Rock" (weekend of July 5–6, 1986)
 "Top 40 Hits of the 1980s, So Far" (weekend of July 4–5, 1987)
 "Top 40 Newcomers of the 1980s, So Far" (weekend of May 30–31, 1988)
 "Triathlon of Rock 'n Roll" (weekend of July 4–5, 1988)
 "World Tour" (weekend of May 27–29, 1989)
 "AT40 Book of Records, 1980s Edition" (weekend of August 31 – September 4, 1989)
 "Top 40 American Acts of the Previous 10 Years" (weekend of July 1–2, 1991)
 "Top 40 Hits of the Past Decade" (weekend of January 2–3, 2010)
 "Top 40 Songs of the Decade" (weekend of December 28–29, 2019)

Annual Countdowns
The top songs of the year are counted down near the turning of each year, though the format has varied over the years.

Top 40 (over 1 week): 1971, 1973, 1999, 2010–present*
Top 50 (over 1 week): 1979, 1994
Top 80 (over 2 weeks): 1970, 1972
Top 100 (over 2 weeks): 1974–78, 1980–82, 1992, 1998, 2000–09
Top 100 (over 1 week): 1983–91, 1993

During the show's original run, the 2-week Top 100 programs came with special instructions for editing the show into one 8-hour block. Conversely, the 1-week Top 100 programs came with instructions to split the show into two 4-hour blocks.

In 1971 and 1973, only the top 40 was counted down because of AT40s Top 40 Christmas Countdowns which aired the week prior. The show did not air Christmas countdowns again until the spinoff shows "American Top 20" and "American Top 10" came into existence, as both of these spinoffs aired a "Top 60 Christmas Songs" special annually the two weeks immediately preceding Christmas.

In 1994, the show was no longer airing in the US, and would be put on hiatus a month later.

Since 2010, the show has aired the same Top 40 year-end chart two weeks in a row, with the only differences being the optional AT40 Extras and re-cut announcements mentioning the Dick Clark's New Year's Rockin' Eve (which Seacrest also hosts) as a past event instead of an upcoming event. An exception to this was in 2019 when the year-end chart was aired only on the weekend before Christmas, because the decade-end chart would air the following weekend, with the normal chart resuming the first weekend of January.

Decade-End Countdowns
In 1979, 1999, 2009 and 2019, the show aired special countdowns of the decade's biggest hits. In 1979 and 1999, the annual year-end countdown show was cut to one week (4 hours) to accommodate the special countdown, though in 2009, they aired a third special week after their usual two-week Top 100. The decade-end shows counted down the Top 50 of the 1970s, and the Top 40s of the 1990s, 2000s, and 2010s. There was no decade-end countdown for the 1980s.

Substitute hosts and guest co-hosts
Over 50 celebrities—among them radio personalities, game show hosts, and (particularly since Ryan Seacrest took over hosting duties) charting artists—have substituted for these three throughout the show's run. Radio announcer Charlie Van Dyke filled in for Casey a record 31 times in the 1980s.

 Guest hosts for Ryan Seacrest 

 Christina Aguilera
 Kris Allen
 Adam Lambert
 Pamela Anderson/Jesse McCartney
 Nick Cannon
 Steve Carell
 Kelly Clarkson
 Miley Cyrus
 Billy Ray Cyrus
 Gavin DeGraw
 Hilary Duff
 Brody Jenner
 Nick Lachey
 Mario Lopez
 Rob Thomas
 Paul Doucette
 Mandy Moore
 Katy Perry
 P. Diddy
 Jessica Simpson
 Timbaland
 Ashley Tisdale
 Taylor Swift
 George Lopez
 Mariah Carey
 Kesha
 Selena Gomez
 Neil Patrick Harris
 Joe Jonas
 Kevin McHale
 Amber Riley
 Jimmy Fallon
 Demi Lovato
 Pitbull
 Britney Spears
 Lady Gaga
 Ed Sheeran
 Jennifer Lopez
 Ariana Grande
 Nick Jonas
 Jason Derulo
 Andy Grammer
 DNCE
 Shawn Mendes
 Charlie Puth
 Meghan Trainor
 Ryan Tedder
 Niall Horan
 Hailee Steinfeld
 Noah Cyrus
 The Chainsmokers
 Macklemore
 James Arthur
 Bebe Rexha
 Sabrina Carpenter
 Bazzi
 5 Seconds of Summer
 Alessia Cara
 Benny Blanco
 Pete Wentz
 MAX
 Ava Max
 Lauv
 Megan Thee Stallion
 Shaggy
 Michael Fitzpatrick
 Lil Jon
 Coldplay's Chris Martin and Jonny Buckland
 Saweetie
 Dave Bayley
 Ben Platt
 Anthony Ramos
 Pat Monahan/Gayle
 Netta
 Em Beihold
 Oak Felder
 Blackbear
 Tate McRae
 Latto
 Jax

Only Katy Perry, Joe Jonas, Jimmy Fallon, Andy Grammer, Sabrina Carpenter, Bazzi, Taylor Swift, Alessia Cara, Lauv, Ed Sheeran, and Ava Max filled in for Seacrest twice or multiple times (though Jonas did solo in 2011 and with DNCE in 2015). Only two artists had the number one song the same week as guest host and they are Shawn Mendes with "Stitches" and Gayle with "abcdefu". 
Since 2021, there are also some artists who became guest co-hosts for some portions of the program (while Seacrest hosts the remaining parts), including:
 Ed Sheeran
 Silk Sonic (Bruno Mars and Anderson .Paak)
 Charlie Puth
 Tiësto and Ava Max
 Blackbear
 Lizzo
 Gayle

 Guest hosts for Casey Kasem 

 Jerry C. Bishop
 Don Bowman
 Chuck Britton
 Joe Cipriano
 Dick Clark
 Mike Cleary
 Gordon Elliott
 Mark Elliott
 Bob Eubanks
 Scott Evans
 Hall & Oates
 Dave Hull AT40s first substitute host
 Mike Kasem
 Wink Martindale
 Ed McMann
 Sonny Melendrez
 Bruce Phillip Miller
 Humble Harve Miller
 Al Mitchell
 Lon Thomas
 Bumper Morgan
 Robert W. Morgan
 Pat O'Brien
 Five for Fighting
 Gary Owens
 David Perry
 Dave Roberts
 Ryan Seacrest
 Lee Sherwood
 Keri Tombazian
 Charlie Tuna
 Charlie Van Dyke
 Larry McKay

Los Angeles deejay "Emperor" Bob Hudson attempted to substitute for Casey sometime between 1976 and 1978 (no specific date was given); however, Hudson had trouble recording his material for AT40, giving up after realizing that he could not host AT40 the same way he would host his morning drive show. As a result, Casey cancelled his vacation and returned to Los Angeles to record that week's AT40, but made sure that Hudson, a legendary disk jockey and comedian, got paid for his work anyway.

 Guest hosts for Shadoe Stevens 

 Harry Anderson
 Joe Cipriano
 Debbie Gibson
 David Hall
 Eduardo Nereo Marino
 Richard Marx
 Nelson
 Donny Osmond
 Martha Quinn
 Meshach Taylor
 Jay Thomas1
 Jack Wagner
 Adrienne Walker
 Jody Watley

1 The week Jay Thomas hosted, October 31, 1992, Chris Cox of KEZY in Anaheim, California (now KFSH-FM) taped a special version for that station at Watermark's studios, because of contractual stipulations that prohibit talent from Los Angeles-based stations from being heard on KEZY (Thomas was still employed at rival KPWR at the time).

 Notable songs played on American Top 40 
 The first song played on the very first American Top 40 show in 1970 at No. 40 was "The End of Our Road" by Marvin Gaye. It would remain and peak at No. 40 the following week.
 The first No. 1 song on American Top 40s inaugural 1970 broadcast was "Mama Told Me Not to Come" by Three Dog Night.
 The first top 10 countdown on the first American Top 40 show featured songs by both Elvis Presley ("The Wonder of You") and The Beatles ("The Long and Winding Road"). These are the top two artists of the entire rock era according to AT40's original source, Billboard magazine.
 The first song played on the first American Top 40 year-end show in 1970 at No. 80 was The Box Tops's "The Letter" as covered by Joe Cocker.
 The first No. 1 song on American Top 40s year-end countdown was "Bridge over Troubled Water" by Simon & Garfunkel.
 When American Top 40s year-end countdown divided from 80 to 40 songs in 1971, the No. 1 song of the year was "Joy to the World" by Three Dog Night.
 When American Top 40s year-end countdown expanded to 100 songs in 1974, the No. 1 song of the year was "The Way We Were" by Barbra Streisand.
 Rick Dees had the No. 1 song "Disco Duck" on American Top 40 in October 1976 long before Dees would launch a rival countdown show, Rick Dees Weekly Top 40.
 When American Top 40 expanded from three to four hours in October 1978, the No. 1 song was "Kiss You All Over" by Exile.
 The very first "Long-Distance Dedication" ever played in 1978 was Neil Diamond's "Desirée".
 When American Top 40s year-end countdown divided from 100 to 50 songs in 1979, the No. 1 song of the year was "My Sharona" by The Knack.
 The No. 1 song of the year for the last Casey Kasem AT40 year-end show in 1987 was "Walk Like an Egyptian" by The Bangles.
 The Moody Blues appeared on the very first AT40 in 1970 (with "Question", which ranked at #27), and Casey Kasem's last episode of the original AT40 on August 6, 1988 ("I Know You're Out There Somewhere", which ranked at #30).
 When Shadoe Stevens replaced Casey Kasem as host on August 13, 1988, the first song he played was "Don't Worry, Be Happy" by Bobby McFerrin which debuted at number 40.
 The No. 1 song for the last Casey Kasem AT40 and the first Shadoe Stevens AT40 was "Roll With It" by Steve Winwood.
 The first song Shadoe Stevens played on his year-end countdown in 1988 was "Prove Your Love" by Taylor Dayne at number 100.
 The No. 1 song of the year for the first Shadoe Stevens AT40 year-end show in 1988 was "Faith" by George Michael.
 When American Top 40 switched from the Billboard Hot 100 to the Billboard Hot 100 Airplay in November 1991, the No. 1 song was "When a Man Loves a Woman" by Michael Bolton.
 When American Top 40 switched from the Billboard Hot 100 Airplay to the Billboard Top 40 Mainstream in January 1993, the No. 1 song was "I Will Always Love You" by Whitney Houston.
 The last No. 1 song on American Top 40 on July 9, 1994, when the show was pulled from American stations, was "Don't Turn Around" by Ace of Base.
 The last No. 1 song on American Top 40 in January 1995 before its 3-year hiatus was "On Bended Knee" by Boyz II Men.
 Before playing the No. 1 song on the final original-run episode of American Top 40, Shadoe Stevens played a special Long-Distance Dedication to his fans: "So Tired of Standing Still, We Got to Move On" by James Brown. As Stevens did his closing at the end of the show, the song "Happy Trails" by Roy Rogers was played in the background.
 When American Top 40 returned in March 1998, the No. 1 song was "My Heart Will Go On" by Celine Dion; it remained in that position since Kasem left his previous program, Casey's Top 40, four weeks earlier.
 In 2000, "Party Up (Up In Here)" by DMX and in 2003, "Breathe" by Blu Cantrell and "Don't Know Why" by Norah Jones, all appeared in the chart three times, after falling off twice during their respective runs. 
 The No. 1 song on Casey Kasem's final AT40 show in January 2004 was "Hey Ya!" by Outkast. It stayed at No. 1 when Ryan Seacrest replaced Kasem.
 On July 5, 2009, the final No. 1 song on American Top 20 was "Second Chance" by Shinedown. The final No. 1 song on American Top 10 was "Love Story" by Taylor Swift.
 The youngest artist to enter the chart is Willow, then age 10 when her song "Whip My Hair" debuted at No. 35 on chart week of December 11, 2010. (The song was recorded when she was 9.)
 The oldest artist to enter the chart is Louis Armstrong, whose "What a Wonderful World" entered the chart at No. 32 (where it peaked) in February 1988. Armstrong was 66 years old when the song was recorded and, had he survived to witness it, would have been 86 when the song became a hit. Recorded in 1967 and originally peaked at No. 116 on Billboard's pop chart, the song entered the Top 40 21 years later, after its appearance in the film Good Morning, Vietnam. (The oldest living artist to chart on AT40 was Gordon Sinclair, who recorded "The Americans" at age 71 and saw it become a hit at age 73; this record was broken in 2021 when Elton John charted at age 74 with Cold Heart (Pnau Remix), a collaboration with Dua Lipa, and the oldest songwriter to chart a song on AT40 was Irving Berlin, who, at 95 years old, reached the top 40 with "Puttin' on the Ritz" as performed by Taco.)
 The oldest recorded song to chart on AT40 was Shaving Cream, a novelty song written by Benny Bell and originally sung in 1946 by Paul Wynn. Recorded in 1946, it took 29 years until it entered the Top 40 in 1975, peaking at #30.
 No song has debuted at #1. The closest it came was "Erotica" by Madonna, debuting at No. 2 on October 17, 1992.
 The song that charted on American Top 40's CHR chart the longest was "Dynamite" by Taio Cruz. It charted for 72 weeks in 2010–11. "Use Somebody" by Kings of Leon charted the longest on the HAC chart for 117 weeks.
 "Black Or White" by Michael Jackson scored the biggest upward movement of the show on November 30, 1991, rising 33 spots from No. 35 to No. 2.
 "See You Again" by Wiz Khalifa ft. Charlie Puth, "Roar" by Katy Perry, "Hello" by Adele, and "Bad Blood" by Taylor Swift ft. Kendrick Lamar took five weeks to get to the No. 1 position, making them the only songs to have the fastest period of time to get to No. 1 in the 21st century. After "See You Again" was on top for 4 weeks, it was replaced by "Want To Want Me" by Jason Derulo (Not one of the tracks to make it to the top in 5 weeks, but lasting 1 week at #1) and then "Bad Blood" by Taylor Swift featuring Kendrick Lamar (Which debuted at #23) and took 5 weeks to get to No. 1.
 In January 2017, Zayn and Taylor Swift's "I Don't Wanna Live Forever" climbed 26 spots from No. 40 to No. 14, the first song to do so since 1972.
 Only one recording with no musical elements has ever appeared on the American Top 40 chart: the comedy sketch "Sister Mary Elephant" by Cheech and Chong, which peaked at No. 28 in 1974. (The aforementioned "The Americans", along with Les Crane's 1971 spoken word hit "Desiderata", both had instrumental music playing in the background.)
 The No. 1 song of the 1970s was "You Light Up My Life" by Debby Boone (The longest run of the decade at 10 weeks).
 The No. 1 song of the 1980s was "Every Breath You Take" by The Police, as canonized by Ryan Seacrest during the 2000s decade-end chart (and repeated during the 2010s decade-end show), since AT40 did not have a 1980s decade-end show. The No. 1 on the Billboard Hot 100 (which AT40 was using in 1989) was "Physical" by Olivia Newton-John (The longest run of the decade at 10 weeks), but whether AT40 would have used that chart, or their own compilation (as they sometimes did) is unknown.
 The No. 1 song of the 1990s was "I Love You Always Forever" by Donna Lewis lasting 12 weeks, but the longest run of the decade was the longest of all time which was "The Sign" by Ace of Base which spent 14 weeks on top.
 The No. 1 song of the 2000s was "Yeah!" by Usher lasting 4 weeks, but the longest run of the decade was "We Belong Together" by Mariah Carey which lasted 12 weeks on top.
 The No. 1 song of the 2010s was "Shape of You" by Ed Sheeran (Tied for the longest run of the decade along with "Blurred Lines" by Robin Thicke, T.I. and Pharrell Williams at 10 weeks).
 The 1,000th episode aired on Saturday, September 30, 1989. The number one song was "Girl I'm Gonna Miss You" by Milli Vanilli.
 The 2,000th episode aired on Saturday, January 14, 2012. The number one song was "We Found Love" by Rihanna.
 When the show aired its 50th anniversary special on July 4, 2020, the CHR chart's No. 1 song was "Intentions" by Justin Bieber featuring Quavo, and the HAC chart's No. 1 song was "Blinding Lights" by The Weeknd.
 Four artists have 'bookended' the year-end countdown, being both the first and last chart positions on the show:
Stevie Wonder in 1986, with "Go Home" at No. 100 and the collaboration "That's What Friends Are For" with Dionne Warwick, Elton John, and Gladys Knight (as "Dionne & Friends") at No. 1.
Kesha in 2010, with "Take It Off" at No. 40 and "Tik Tok" at No. 1.
Twenty One Pilots in 2016, with "Heathens" at No. 40 and "Stressed Out" at No. 1.
 The first number one hit not to be sung in English was Falco's "Rock Me Amadeus" in 1986. In its original recording, the song's lyrics are entirely in German, though the show would sometimes play a mix that omitted the verses in favor of a timeline (narrated in English) of the life of Wolfgang Amadeus Mozart.
 In July 2018, "Mine" by Bazzi became the shortest song at 2:13 to reach No. 1.
 In 2019, Lil Nas X's "Old Town Road" became the shortest song on the chart at 1:53.
 Also in 2019, Billie Eilish became the first artist to be born in the 2000s to have a number 1 song with "Bad Guy".
 In March 2020 "Circles" by Post Malone became the first song in 25 years to reclaim the No. 1 spot 3 times. Later that year in July 2020, The Weeknd's "Blinding Lights" became the second. The others were "Another Night" by Real McCoy and "On Bended Knee" by Boyz II Men in 1994 and 1995, respectively.
 In July 2021, Lil Nas X's "Montero (Call Me by Your Name)" became the second shortest song at 2:17 to reach No. 1. The first song being "Mine" by Bazzi at 2:13 in 2018, falling only 4 seconds short of being the shortest.
 In August 2021, Olivia Rodrigo became the first female solo artist to hold the top two songs by herself, namely "Good 4 U" at No. 1 and "Deja Vu" at No. 2. Iggy Azalea and Halsey are also held their respective top two spots but has collaborated artists. She also became the first artist to have her first four singles on the same chart when "Traitor" debuted at No. 35 since "Drivers License" was still on that week's chart.
 From October–December 2021, "STAY" by The Kid Laroi and Justin Bieber held the top spot for 11 weeks, being the longest-running No. 1 of 2021 (As well as becoming the longest run of the decade), surpassing "Mood" by 24kGoldn and Iann Dior on its last week on top, falling one week short of being the longest running No. 1 of the century ("We Belong Together" was the longest), and was the most successful song for both artists. It was replaced by "Industry Baby" by Lil Nas X and Jack Harlow.
 In December 2021, "Heat Waves" by Glass Animals became the highest song to re-enter the chart (#14 on the CHR version and No. 18 on the HAC version months after dropping off the chart and having peaked at that same position on the CHR chart). In February 2022, the song became one of the few songs in the show's history to have its first week at No. 1 after re-entering the chart.
 In March 2022, "Ghost" became Justin Bieber's 12th song to reach No. 1, making him the artist with most number one songs of the 21st century.
 In May 2022, Latto hit number 1 with "Big Energy". It sampled the Tom Tom Club's "Genius of Love" (which peaked No. 31 in 1982), which was also sampled in Mariah Carey's 1995 number 1 hit "Fantasy". The Tom Tom Club's hit song became the first to be sampled in two number one songs.
 In July 2022, Kate Bush's "Running Up That Hill", which originally spent 4 weeks on AT40 in 1985, re-entered the chart at No. 31 on CHR and No. 30 on Hot AC due to its resurgence in popularity after being featured in an episode of Netflix's Stranger Things.
 In October 2022, Armani White's single "BILLIE EILISH." became the shortest song on the chart at 1:39.

References
 Durkee, Rob. American Top 40: The Countdown of the Century. . New York City: Schirmer Books, 1999. Accessed December 10, 2007.

Further reading
 Battistini, Pete. American Top 40 with Casey Kasem (The 1970s). Authorhouse.com, January 31, 2005. .
 Battistini, Pete. American Top 40 with Casey Kasem (The 1980s). Authorhouse.com, December 21, 2010. .
 

External links

 
 
  (Classic AT40 70s/80s)

 Archive 1955 through 2006
 Listen to American Top 40 online – list of radio stations carrying Ryan Seacrest's American Top 40
 AT 40 80's CURRENT Station List (As Of May 2, 2022) | American Top 40 Fun & Games Site – List of radio stations carrying Classic American Top 40
 ‘Well, Here It Comes! The Biggest Song in the U.S.A.!’ – The New York Times, 2011 – on the meaning of the Top 40
 Charis Music Group's AT40 calendar from July 1970 to January 1995 – featuring cue sheets for many shows in PDF format. Website also has converted many episodes of AT40 to digital format for re-broadcast. Also features info on other countdown shows and syndicated programs
 AT40 with Casey and Shadoe – history of the show as well as pictures and scans of AT40'' cue sheets, memos, and more
 Weekly American Top 40 charts archive

 
American music radio programs
American record charts
IHeartRadio digital channels
Music chart shows
Radio programs on XM Satellite Radio
1970 radio programme debuts